Hajika is a village situated 190 km south from Quetta in the Surab Tehsil of Surab District in the province of Balochistan, Pakistan. The main tribe is Mahmasani, Mardashahi, Reki and Harooni.

Tribes
The main tribes of this village are Muhammad Hassni, Shaikh Hussaini, Raki, Mulazai, Botawzai. There is one high school for boys and one high school for girls in Hajika. Majority of population is educated. Main leaders are Haji Muhammad Yaqoub. Mir Hidayatullah . Engineer M.Amin And Hakim Abdul Latif Muhammad Hassni.

References

Populated places in Balochistan, Pakistan